Hanover Township is the name of three townships in the U.S. state of Indiana:

 Hanover Township, Jefferson County, Indiana
 Hanover Township, Lake County, Indiana
 Hanover Township, Shelby County, Indiana

Indiana township disambiguation pages